B. Williams & Co. Store is a historic country store located near Mathews, Mathews County, Virginia. It was built in 1869–1870, and is a two-story frame mercantile building. The building features Classical Greek Revival elements including an original cornice with dentilled molding and curved brackets. The store functioned as a post office, commercial and residential building from its completion until the end of steamboat traffic in Mobjack Bay in 1935.

It was listed on the National Register of Historic Places in 2009.

References

Commercial buildings on the National Register of Historic Places in Virginia
Greek Revival architecture in Virginia
Commercial buildings completed in 1870
Buildings and structures in Mathews County, Virginia
National Register of Historic Places in Mathews County, Virginia